Leptotes is a butterfly genus in the family Lycaenidae. They are commonly known as zebra blues in reference to their zebra-striped undersides.

The genus Cyclyrius was recently synonymized with Leptotes and its two species were thus moved to this genus.

Species
The genus can be divided in several distinct geographic groups which often correspond to clades:

Afrotropical and Palaearctic species:
 Leptotes adamsoni Collins & Larsen, 1991 – Adamson's zebra blue
 Leptotes babaulti (Stempffer, 1935) – Babault's zebra blue
 Leptotes brevidentatus (Tite, 1958) – Tite's zebra blue
 Leptotes casca (Tite, 1958)
 Leptotes cassioides (Capronnier, 1889)
 Leptotes durrelli Fric, Pyrcz & Wiemers, 2019
 Leptotes jeanneli (Stempffer, 1935)
 Leptotes mandersi (Druce, 1907)
 Leptotes marginalis (Stempffer, 1944) – black-bordered zebra blue
 Leptotes mayottensis (Tite, 1958)
 Leptotes pirithous (Linnaeus, 1767) – Lang's short-tailed blue, common zebra blue
 Leptotes pulcher (Murray, 1874) – beautiful zebra blue
 Leptotes pyrczi Libert, 2011
 Leptotes rabefaner (Mabille, 1877)
 Leptotes sanctithomae (Sharpe, 1893)
 Leptotes socotranus (Ogilvie-Grant, 1899)
 Leptotes webbianus (Brullé, 1839) – Canary blue

Indomalayan species:
 Leptotes plinius (Fabricius, 1793) – zebra blue, plumbago blue

Australasian species:
 Leptotes lybas (Godart, [1824])

Neotropical species:
 Leptotes andicola (Godman & Salvin, 1891)
 Leptotes bathyllos Tessmann, 1928
 Leptotes callanga (Dyar, 1913)
 Leptotes cassius (Cramer, [1775]) – Cassius blue, tropical striped blue
 Leptotes delalande Bálint & Johnson, 1995
 Leptotes lamasi Bálint & Johnson, 1995
 Leptotes marina (Reakirt, 1868) – marine blue, striped blue
 Leptotes parrhasioides (Wallengren, 1860) – Galapagos blue
 Leptotes perkinsae Kaye, 1931
 Leptotes trigemmatus (Butler, 1881)

References

  (2008): Tree of Life Web Project – Leptotes Scudder 1876. The Zebra Blues. Version of 2008-MAY-19. Retrieved 2009-NOV-29. 
  (2009): Markku Savela's Lepidoptera and some other life forms – Leptotes. Version of 2009-MAY-24. Retrieved 2009-NOV-29.

External links

Marine Blue, Leptotes marina at Butterflies and Moths of North America
Cassius Blue, Leptotes cassius at Butterflies and Moths of North America
Leptotes at Markku Savela's website on Lepidoptera

 
Lycaenidae of South America
Lycaenidae genera